Griffith van Wyk (born ) is a South African rugby union player for the  in the Currie Cup. His regular position is lock.

Van Wyk was named in the  squad for the 2021 Currie Cup Premier Division. He previously represented  in the Rugby Pro D2.

References

South African rugby union players
1990 births
Living people
Rugby union locks
Blue Bulls players
Falcons (rugby union) players
US Colomiers players